Lengvenis (Simeon Lingwen, born ca. 1360 – died after 1431; ;) was one of the sons of Algirdas, Grand Duke of Lithuania, and the ruler of Great Novgorod Republic (1389–1392, 1406–1411). He was known for his skills as a military leader.

Lengvenis was born to Algirdas and his second wife Uliana Alexandrovna of Tver. In 1387 battle with the Teutonic Knights Lengvenis commanded one of Lithuanian formations. In 1389–1392 he was appointed by his brother Władysław II Jagiełło, Grand Duke of Lithuania and King of Poland, as regent of Great Novgorod. He was baptized in the Orthodox rite as Simon and received the title of Prince of Great Novgorod. He paid homage to King Władysław II Jagiełło in Sandomierz in 1389, thus making the Novgorod Republic a fiefdom of the Polish Crown. After Lengvenis lost this title in 1392, Vytautas the Great appointed him to Mstsislaw in then eastern Lithuania. In 1406–1411 Lengvenis, once again, was nominated by Vytautas as regent of Great Novgorod. As ruler of Novgorod he led battles against Pskov, Livonian Order, and Sweden.

In 1410, Lengvenis participated in the Battle of Grunwald. He led his own "banner", and a certain Georgy- the next banner in the famous list of chronicler Jan Długosz. Often this George is considered the son of Lengvenis, Yury. Many historians believe that under the command of Lengvenis there were three banners of Smolensk land, which played a significant role in the battle. In 1411 Lengvenis participated in the signing of the Peace of Thorn. He was married to Maria Dmitrovna, princess of Moscow, the daughter of Dmitri Donskoi.

In 1380 he founded the Monastery of the Dormition in Pustynki near Mstsislaw in then eastern Lithuania, now Belarus.

See also
 House of Algirdas – family tree of Lengvenis

References
  Batūra, Romas (2005). "Lengvenis", Vytautas Spečiūnas (compiler) Gediminaičiai. Vilnius: Mokslo ir enciklopedijų leidybos institutas, 184. 
  Jučas, Mečislovas (1990). Žalgirio mūšis (Battle of Grunwald). Vilnius: Mokslas, 174. .

1360s births
1430s deaths
Gediminids
People in the Battle of Grunwald